Eupithecia amandae is a moth in the family Geometridae. It is found in China.

References

Moths described in 2011
amandae
Moths of Asia